The Ryesŏng River is a river of North Korea.  It flows from north to south, emptying into the Yellow Sea by Ganghwa Island, just west of the mouth of the River Imjin.

See also
Rivers of Korea
Yellow Sea

References

External links

Rivers of North Korea